Až po uši (English: Head Over Heels) is a Czech romantic television series from 2014-2018, directed by Jan Hřebejk and produced by HBO. Anna Geislerová, Jiří Havelka, Jitka Čvančarová, Hynek Čermák, Anna Polívková, Jana Kolesárová, Lenka Krobotová and Radek Holub appeared in the main roles. In the second row, Zuzana Šulajová, Stanislav Majer, Taťjana Medvecká and František Němec joined the main characters.

The music for the series, including the theme song called "Girl", was composed by Vladivojna La Chia. She sang the theme song together with singer Matěj Ruppert.

The series has a total of twenty-three episodes, each lasting an average of thirty-five minutes. It is based on Israeli series Matay Nitnashek.

Plot
The focuses on various romantic relationships. Šárka is in love with Jakub but Jakub's ex-girlfriend Markéta stands in her way. Zuzana has problems with her philandering husband Milan and she herself later finds love with the masseuse Linda . Zuzana's friend Ema has problems with her appearance and ignores the interest of her colleague Karel.

Cast
Anna Geislerová as Šárka
Jiří Havelka as Jakub
Jitka Čvančarová as Zuzana
Hynek Čermák as Milan
Anna Polívková as Ema
Radek Holub as Karel
Lenka Krobotová as Markéta
Jana Kolesárová as Linda

External links
IMDb.com

References 

Czech romantic television series
2014 television series debuts
2018 television series endings
Czech-language HBO original programming
Czech LGBT-related television shows